The  is the top tag team title in the Japanese professional wrestling promotion Osaka Pro Wrestling. The title was established in 2001 when Daio Quallt and Gamma won a seven-team round-robin tournament to win the inaugural titles.

Being a professional wrestling championship, it is not won via direct competition; it is instead won via a predetermined ending to a match or awarded to a wrestler because of a wrestling angle. There have been forty-two reigns by thirty-six teams among thirty-seven individual wrestlers. The current champions are Gaina and Hub, who are in their second reign as a team.

Title history

Names

Reigns

Combined reigns

By team
{| class="wikitable sortable" style="text-align: center"
!Rank
!Team
!No. ofreigns
!Combined days
|-
!1
|style="background-color:#FFE6BD"| Zero/HUB and Gaina † || 2 || +
|-
!2
| Takoyakida and Ultimate Spider Jr. || 1 || 463
|-
!3
| Sengoku || 3 || 459
|-
!4
| Billyken Kid and Tigers Mask || 1 || 379
|-
!5
| Jushin Thunder Liger and Takehiro Murahama || 1 || 308
|-
!6
| Momo no Seishun Tag || 3 || 287
|-
!7
| Infinity || 3 || 270
|-
!8
| GLARE || 1 || 251
|-
!9
| JOKER || 1 || 238
|-
!10
| Daio QUALLT and "Big Boss" MA-G-MA || 1 || 234
|-
!11
| The Big Guns || 2 || 210
|-
!12
| Billyken Kid and Black Buffalo || 1 || 177
|-
!13
| Bad Stream || 1 || 161
|-
!14
| Caramel Boy and Kaiju New World || 1 || 155
|-
!15
| Don Fujii and Masaaki Mochizuki || 1 || 136
|-
!16
| JOKER || 1 || 121
|-
!rowspan=2|17
| Billyken Kid and Hideyoshi || 1 || 119
|-
| Gamma and Super Shisa || 1 || 119
|-
!19
| Kagetora and Rasse || 1 || 111
|-
!20
| Tigers Mask and Black Buffalo || 2 || 104
|-
!21
| Mucha Lucha || 1 || 94
|-
!22
| Takehiro Murahama and Kaiju Zeta Mandora || 1 || 92
|-
!23
| Rising Hayato and Santaro Ishizuchi || 1 || 83
|-
!24
| Joker || 1 || 77
|-
!25
| Gaina and Zeus || 1 || 72
|-
!26
| Daio QUALLT and Gamma || 1 || 69
|-
!27
| Mucha Lucha || 1 || 67
|-
!28
| Daio QUALLT and Black Buffalo || 1 || 56
|-
!29
| Billyken Kid and Perro || 1 || 55
|-
!30
| Miracleman and Azteca || 1 || 40
|-
!31
| Gamma and Super Delfin || 1 || 39
|-
!32
| Tsubasa and Billyken Kid || 1 || 36
|-
!33
| Magnitude Kishiwada and Takashi Yoshida || 1 || 31

By wrestler 
{|class="wikitable sortable" style="text-align: center"
!Rank
!Wrestler
!data-sort-type="number"|No. ofreigns
!data-sort-type="number"|Combined days	
|-
!1
|style="background-color:#FFE6BD"| Gaina † || 3 || +
|-
!2
|style="background-color:#FFE6BD"| Zero/HUB † || 2 || +
|-
!3
| Billyken Kid || 5 || 766
|-
!4
| Black Buffalo || 7 || 607
|-
!5
| Hideyoshi || 4 || 578
|-
!6
| Tadasuke || 3 || 533
|-
!7
| Hayata || 2 || 489
|-
!8
| Tigers Mask || 3 || 483
|-
!rowspan=2|9
| Takoyakida || 1 || 463
|-
| Ultimate Spider Jr. || 1 || 463
|-
!11
| Takehiro Murahama || 2 || 400
|-
!12
| Asian Cooger/Asian Cougar/Kuuga || 4 || 399
|-
!13
| Daio QUALLT || 3 || 359
|-
!14
| Magnitude Kishiwada/Kaiju Zeta Mandora/"Big Boss" MA-G-MA. || 3 || 357
|-
!15
| Jushin Thunder Liger || 1 || 308
|-
!16
| Tsubasa || 4 || 306
|-
!rowspan=2|17
| Atsushi Kotoge || 3 || 287
|-
| Daisuke Harada || 3 || 287
|-
!19
| Zeus || 3 || 282
|-
!20
| Gamma || 3 || 227
|-
!21
| The Bodyguard || 2 || 210
|-
!22
| Kazuaki Mihara || 1 || 161
|-
!23
| Orochi || 2 || 156
|-
!rowspan=2|24
| Caramel Boy || 1 || 155
|-
| Kaiju New World || 1 || 155
|-
!26
| Super Shisa || 1 || 119
|-
!rowspan=2|27
| Don Fujii || 1 || 106
|-
| Masaaki Mochizuki || 1 || 106
|-
!rowspan=2|29
| Rising Hayato || 1 || 83
|-
| Santaro Ishizuchi || 1 || 83
|-
!31
| Perro || 1 || 55
|-
!rowspan=2|32
| Azteca || 1 || 40
|-
| Miracleman || 1 || 40
|-
!34
| Super Delfin || 1 || 39
|-
!35
| Takashi Yoshida || 1 || 31

References

External links
http://osaka.puroresufan.com/?page_id=652

Osaka Pro Wrestling championships
Tag team wrestling championships